The Ardennes Counteroffensive, commonly known as the Battle of the Bulge, was a massive military operation undertaken by Nazi Germany in southern Belgium and northern Luxembourg which lasted from 16 December 1944 until 25 January 1945. The intent of the offensive was to split the ground forces of the Western Allies from each other and encourage them to make peace with Germany, leaving all of Germany's military might to fight off the resurgent USSR. 

The operation was conceived entirely by German head of state and armed forces chief Adolf Hitler. The plan was vigorously opposed by the two ranking generals who would oversee the assault, who saw only a waste of men and materiel with little chance of success. The Fūhrer dismissed all objections, convinced that the elite German forces would roll over the war-weary and/or inexperienced American formations in the Ardennes Forest and drive all the way to the English Channel port of Antwerp.

In order to mislead any Allied intelligence personnel who might discover the plan, it was given the defensive sounding name Wacht am Rhein, meaning "watch on the Rhine".  

The order of battle presented here reflects a point near the end of the campaign. As with any large army organization in extended combat, forces and their assignments shifted over the course of the battle. For example, when the German attack began on 16 December, the US 7th Armored Division was assigned to XIII Corps, US Ninth Army, 12th Army Group. Later that day, its alignment became VIII Corps, US First Army, 12th Army Group. On 20 December, the alignment switched to XVIII Corps, US First Army, 12th Army Group — and later that day to XVIII Corps, US First Army, 21st Army Group. On 18 January 1945, the alignment changed one last time, to XVIII Corps, US First Army, 12th Army Group — as it is given in the following hierarchy. This OOB  — specifically, at a point near the end of the battle, which lasted from 16 December 1944 until 25 January 1945.

See for Allied and German Orders of Battle: December 1944 & January 1945: (Tucker-Jones pp 263-287)

High-level orders of battle

Axis 

Oberbefehlshaber West
Generalfeldmarschall Gerd von Rundstedt

Heeresgruppe B
Generalfeldmarschall Walter Model

Armies deployed North to South:

  Sixth Panzer Army (Northern Sector)
 Oberstgruppenführer der Waffen SS Josef "Sepp" Dietrich
 I SS Panzer Corps (SS-Gruppenführer Hermann Priess)
 II SS Panzer Corps (SS-Obergruppenführer Willi Bittrich)
 LXVII Corps (Generalleutnant Otto Hitzfeld)
  Fifth Panzer Army (Central Sector)
 General der Panzertruppen Hasso von Manteuffel
 XXXIX Panzer Corps (Genlt Karl Decker)
 XLVII Panzer Corps (General der Panzertruppen Heinrich Freiherr von Lüttwitz)
 LVIII Panzer Corps (General der Panzertruppen Walter Krüger)
 LXVI Corps (General der Artillerie Walter Lucht)
  Seventh Army (Southern Sector)
 General der Panzertruppen Erich Brandenberger
 LIII Corps (General der Kavallerie Edwin von Rothkirch)
 LXXX Corps (General der Infanterie Franz Beyer)
 LXXXV Corps (General der Infanterie Baptist Kniess)

Allies 

 Supreme Headquarters Allied Expeditionary Forces
General of the Army Dwight D. Eisenhower

Armies deployed North to South:

  21st Army Group
 Field Marshal Sir Bernard Law Montgomery
 UK XXX Corps (Lt-Gen. Brian G. Horrocks)
  12th Army Group
 Lieutenant General Omar N. Bradley
 US First Army (Lieut. Gen. Courtney H. Hodges)
 V Corps (Maj. Gen. Leonard T. Gerow)
 VII Corps (Maj. Gen. J. Lawton Collins)
 XVIII Airborne Corps (Maj. Gen. Matthew B. Ridgway)
 US Third Army (Lieut. Gen. George S. Patton Jr.)
 III Corps (Maj. Gen. John Millikin)
 VIII Corps (Maj. Gen. Troy H. Middleton)
 XII Corps (Maj. Gen. Manton S. Eddy)
 Allied air forces
  US Strategic Air Forces in Europe (General Carl Spaatz)
 US Eighth Air Force (Strategic) (Lt. Gen. James H. Doolittle)
 US Ninth Air Force (Tactical) (Lt. Gen. Hoyt S. Vandenberg)
  Royal Air Force
 Bomber Command (Air Chief Marshal Sir Arthur "Bomber" Harris)
 Fighter Command (Air Marshal Sir Roderic Hill)
 Second Tactical Air Force (Air Marshal Sir Arthur Coningham)

Axis forces

Sixth Panzer Army (Northern Sector) 

Oberstgruppenführer der Waffen SS Josef "Sepp" Dietrich
 Army-level units
 683rd Heavy Antitank Battalion
 217th Assault Panzer Battalion
 394th, 667th, and 902nd Assault Gun Battalions
 741st Antitank Battalion
 1098th, 1110th, and 1120th Heavy Howitzer Batteries
 428th Heavy Mortar Battery
 1123rd K-3 Battery
 2nd Flak Division (41st and 43rd Regiments)
 von der Heydte Fallschirmjager Battalion
 4th Todt Brigade

LXVII Corps 
Generalleutnant Otto Hitzfeld
‡ Units involved in the initial assault 16 Dec

 Corps-level units
 17th Volkswerfer Brigade (88th and 89th Werfer Regiments)
 405th Volksartillerie Corps
 1001st Heavy Assault Gun Company

  3rd Panzergrenadier Division
 Generalmajor Walter Denkert
 8th and 29th Panzergrenadier Regiments
 103rd Panzer Battalion
 3rd Artillery Regiment
 103rd Recon Battalion
 3rd Antitank Battalion
 3rd Engineer Battalion
 3rd Flak Battalion
 3rd Signals Battalion

 246th Volksgrenadier Division
 Oberst Peter Körte
 352nd, 404th, and 689th VG Regiments
 246th Artillery Regiment
 246th Antitank Battalion
 246th Engineer Battalion
 246th Signals Battalion

 272nd Volksgrenadier Division
 Generalmajor Eugen König
 980th, 981st, and 982nd Volksgrenadier Regiments
 272nd Artillery Regiment
 272nd Antitank Battalion
 272nd Engineer Battalion
 272nd Signals Battalion

 326th Volksgrenadier Division ‡
 Oberst Erwin Kaschner
 751st, 752nd, and 753rd Volksgrenadier Regiments
 326th Artillery Regiment
 326th Antitank Battalion
 326th Engineer Battalion
 326th Signals Battalion

I SS Panzer Corps 

SS-Gruppenführer Hermann Prieß
‡ Units involved in the initial assault 16 Dec

 Corps-level units
 4th Volkswerfer Brigade (51st and 53rd Werfer Regiments)
 9th Volkswerfer Brigade (14th and 54th Werfer Regiments)
 388th Volksartillerie Corps
 402nd Volksartillerie Corps
 501st SS-Artillery Battalion
 501st SS-Artillery Observation Battalion

  1st SS Panzer Division Leibstandarte Adolph Hitler ‡
 SS Oberführer Wilhelm Mohnke
 1st SS Panzer Regiment
 1st and 2nd SS Panzergrenadier Regiments
 1st SS Artillery Regiment
 1st SS Recon Battalion
 1st SS Antitank Battalion
 1st SS Engineer Battalion
 1st SS Flak Battalion
 1st SS Signals Battalion
 501st SS Heavy Panzer Battalion (attached)
 84th Luftwaffe Flak Battalion (attached)

  3rd Fallschirmjäger Division ‡
 Generalmajor Walther Wadehn
 5th, 8th, and 9th Parachute Infantry Regiments
 3rd Artillery Regiment
 3rd Recon Battalion
 3rd Antitank Battalion
 3rd Engineer Battalion
 3rd Signals battalion

  12th SS Panzer Division Hitler Jugend ‡
 SS Standartenführer Hugo Kraas
 12th SS Panzer Regiment
 25th and 26th SS Panzergrenadier Regiments
 12th SS Artillery Regiment
 12th SS Recon Battalion
 12th SS Antitank Battalion
 12th SS Engineer Battalion
 12th SS Flak Battalion
 560th Heavy Antitank Battalion (attached)

  12th Volksgrenadier Division ‡
 Generalmajor Gerhard Engel
 27th Fusilier and 48th and 89th Volksgrenadier Regiments
 12th Artillery Regiment
 12th Antitank Battalion
 12th Fusilier Battalion
 12th Engineer Battalion
 12th Signals Battalion

  277th Volksgrenadier Division ‡
 Oberst Wilhelm Viebig
 289th, 990th, and 991st Volksgrenadier Regiments
 277th Artillery Regiment
 277th Antitank Battalion
 277th Engineer Battalion
 277th Signals Battalion

 150th Panzer Brigade ‡
 Obersturmbannführer der Waffen SS Otto Skorzeny
 Two Panzer companies
 Two Panzergrenadier companies
 Two antitank companies
 A heavy mortar battalion (two batteries)
 600th SS Parachute Battalion Kampfgruppe 200 (Luftwaffe ground unit)
 An anti-partisan company

II SS Panzer Corps 

SS Obergruppenführer Willi Bittrich

 Corps-level units
 410th Volksartillerie Corps
 502nd SS Heavy Artillery Battalion
 502nd SS Artillery Observation Battalion

  2nd SS Panzer Division Das Reich
 SS Brigadeführer Heinz Lammerding
 2nd SS Panzer Regiment
 3rd and 4th SS Panzergrenadier Regiments
 2nd SS Artillery Regiment
 2nd SS Recon Battalion
 2nd SS Engineer Battalion
 2nd SS Flak Battalion
 2nd SS Signals Battalion

  9th SS Panzer Division Hohenstaufen
 SS Oberführer Sylvester Stadler
 9th SS Panzer Regiment
 19th and 20th SS Panzergrenadier Regiments
 9th SS Artillery Regiment
 9th SS Recon Battalion
 9th SS Antitank Battalion
 9th SS Engineer Battalion
 9th SS Flak Battalion
 9th SS Signals Battalion
 519th Heavy Antitank Battalion (attached)

Fifth Panzer Army (Central Sector) 

General der Panzertruppen Hasso von Manteuffel

 Army-level units
 19th Flak Brigade
 207th and 600th Engineer Battalions
 653rd Heavy Panzerjäger Battalion
 669th Ost (East) Battalion
 638th, 1094th, and 1095th Heavy Artillery Batteries
 25th/975th Fortress Artillery Battery
 1099th, 1119th, and 1121st Heavy Mortar Batteries
 3rd Todt Brigade (paramilitary engineers)

LXVI Corps 
General der Artillerie Walter Lucht

 Corps-level units
 16th Volkswerfer Brigade (86th and 87th Werfer Regiments)
 244th Assault Gun Brigade
 460th Heavy Artillery Battalion

 18th Volksgrenadier Division ‡
 Oberst Günther Hoffmann-Schönborn
 293rd, 294th, and 295th Volksgrenadier Regiments
 1818th Artillery Regiment
 1818th Antitank Battalion
 1818th Engineer Battalion
 1818th Signals Battalion 

  62nd Volksgrenadier Division ‡
 Oberst Friedrich Kittel
 164th, 193rd, and 190th Volksgrenadier Regiments
 162nd Artillery Regiment
 162nd Antitank Battalion
 162nd Engineer Battalion
 162nd Signals Battalion

LVIII Panzer Corps 

General der Panzertruppen Walter Krüger

 Corps-level units
 7th Volkswerfer Brigade (84th and 85th Werfer Regiments)
 401st Volksartillerie Corps
 1st Flak Regiment

   116th Panzer Division ‡
 Generalmajor Siegfried von Waldenburg
 16th Panzer Regiment
 60th and 156th Panzergrenadier Regiments
 146th Artillery Regiment
 146th Recon Battalion
 226th Antitank Battalion
 675th Engineer Battalion
 281st Flak Battalion

  560th Volksgrenadier Division ‡
 Oberst Rudolf Langhauser
 1128th, 1129th, and 1130th Volksgrenadier Regiments
 1560th Artillery Regiment
 1560th Antitank Battalion
 1560th Engineer Battalion
 1560th Signals Battalion

XLVII Panzer Corps 

General der Panzertruppen Heinrich Freiherr von Lüttwitz

 Corps-level units
 15th Volkswerfer Brigade
 182nd Flak Regiment
 766th Volksartillerie Corps

  2nd Panzer Division ‡
 Oberst Meinrad von Lauchert
 3rd Panzer Regiment
 2nd and 304th Panzergrenadier Regiments
 74th Artillery Regiment
 2nd Recon Battalion
 38th Antitank Battalion
 38th Engineer Battalion
 273rd Flak Battalion
 38th Signals Battalion

  9th Panzer Division
 Generalmajor Harald Freiherr von Elverfeldt
 33rd Panzer Regiment
 10th and 11th Panzergrenadier Regiments
 102nd Artillery Regiment
 9th Recon Battalion
 50th Antitank Battalion
 86th Engineer Battalion
 287th Flak Battalion
 81st Signals Battalion
 301st Heavy Panzer Battalion (attached)

  Panzer-Lehr-Division ‡
 Generalleutnant Fritz Bayerlein
 130th Panzer Regiment
 901st and 902nd Panzergrenadier Regiments
 130th Artillery Regiment
 130th Recon Battalion
 130th Antitank Battalion
 130th Engineer Battalion
 311th Flak Battalion
 559th Antitank Battalion (attached)
 243rd Assault Gun Brigade (attached)

  26th Volksgrenadier Division ‡
 Generalmajor Heinz Kokott
 39th Fusilier and 77th and 78th Volksgrenadier Regiments
 26th Artillery Regiment
 26th Recon Battalion
 26th Antitank Battalion
 26th Engineer Battalion
 26th Signals Battalion

 Führer Begleit Brigade
 Oberst Otto Remer
 102nd Panzer Battalion
 100th Panzergrenadier Regiment
 120th Artillery Regiment
 120th Recon Battalion
 120th Engineer Battalion
 828th Grenadier Battalion
 673rd Antitank Battalion

XXXIX Panzer Corps 

Generalleutnant Karl Decker

  167th Volksgrenadier Division
 Generalleutnant Hanskurt Höcker
 331st, 339th, 387th Volksgrenadier Regiments
 167th Artillery Regiment
 167th Antitank Battalion
 167th Engineer Battalion
 167th Signals Battalion

Seventh Army (Southern Sector) 

General der Panzertruppen Erich Brandenberger

 Army-level units
 657th and 668th Heavy Antitank Battalions
 501st Fortress Antitank Battalion
 47th Engineer Battalion
 1092nd, 1093rd, 1124th, and 1125th Heavy Howitzer Batteries
 660th Heavy Artillery Battery
 1029th, 1039th, and 1122nd Heavy Mortar Batteries
 999th Penal Battalion
 44th Machine Gun Battalion
 15th Flak Regiment
 1st Todt Brigade

LXXXV Corps 
General der Infanterie Baptist Knieß

 Corps-level units
 406th Volksartillerie Corps
 18th Volkswerfer Brigade (21st and 22nd Werfer Regiments)

 5th Fallschirmjäger Division ‡
 Generalmajor Ludwig Heilmann
 13th, 14th, and 15th Parachute Infantry Regiments
 5th Artillery Regiment
 5th Recon Battalion
 5th Engineer Battalion
 5th Flak Battalion
 11th Assault Gun Brigade

  352nd Volksgrenadier Division ‡
 Oberst Erich-Otto Schmidt
 914th, 915th, and 916th Volksgrenadier Regiments
 352nd Artillery Regiment
 352nd Antitank Battalion
 352nd Engineer Battalion
 352nd Signals Battalion

  79th Volksgrenadier Division
 Oberst Alois Weber
 208th, 212th, and 226th Volksgrenadier Regiments
 179th Artillery Regiments
 179th Antitank Battalion
 179th Engineer Battalion
 179th Signals Battalion

LXXX Corps 
General der Infanterie Franz Beyer

 Corps-level units
 408th Volksartillerie Corps
 8th Volkswerfer Brigade
 2nd and Lehr Werfer Regiments

 212th Volksgrenadier Division ‡
 Generalmajor Franz Sensfuß
 316th, 320th, and 423rd VG Regiments
 212th Artillery Regiment
 212th Antitank Battalion
 212th Engineer Battalion
 212th Signals Battalion

 276th Volksgrenadier Division ‡
 Generalmajor Kurt Möhring
 986th, 987th, and 988th VG Regiments
 276th Artillery Regiment
 276th Antitank Battalion
 276th Engineer Battalion
 276th Signals Battalion

  340th Volksgrenadier Division
 Oberst Theodor Tolsdorff
 694th, 695th, and 696th VG Regiments
 340th Artillery Regiment
 340th Antitank Battalion
 340th Engineer Battalion
 340th Signals Battalion

LIII Corps 

General der Kavallerie Edwin von Rothkirch

  9th Volksgrenadier Division
 Oberst Werner Kolb
 36th, 57th, and 116th VG Regiments
 9th Artillery Regiment
 9th Antitank Battalion
 9th Engineer Battalion
 9th Signals Battalion

 15th Panzergrenadier Division
 Oberst Hans Joachim Deckert
 104th and 115th Pzgr Regiments
 115th Panzer Battalion
 115th Artillery Regiment
 115th Recon Battalion
 33rd Antitank Battalion
 33rd Engineer Battalion
 33rd Flak Battalion
 33rd Signals Battalion

  Führer Grenadier Brigade
 Oberst Hans-Joachim Kahler
 99th Pzgr Regiment
 101st Panzer Battalion
 911th Assault Gun Brigade
 124th Antitank Battalion
 124th Engineer Battalion
 124th Flak Battalion
 124th Artillery Regiment

Luftwaffe
II Fighter Corps
 Generalmajor Dietrich Peltz

III Flak Corps
 Generalleutnant Wolfgang Pickert

Allied Forces

Armies deployed north to south

Allied 21st Army Group 

Field Marshal Sir Bernard L. Montgomery

XXX Corps 

Lt-Gen. Brian G. Horrocks

 2nd Household Cavalry Regiment
 11th Hussars
 4th Regiment, Royal Horse Artillery
 5th Regiment, Royal Horse Artillery
 73rd Antitank Regiment, Royal Artillery
 7th, 64th, and 84th Medium Regiments, Royal Artillery
 27th Light AA Regiment, Royal Artillery

  6th Airborne Division
 Maj-Gen. Eric Bols
 3rd Parachute Brigade
 8th (Midlands) Parachute Battalion
 9th (Eastern and Home Counties) Parachute Battalion
 1st Canadian Parachute Battalion
 5th Parachute Brigade
 7th (Light Infantry) Parachute Battalion
 12th (Yorkshire) Parachute Battalion
 13th (Lancashire) Parachute Battalion
 6th Airlanding Brigade
 12th Battalion, Devonshire Regiment
 2nd Battalion, Oxfordshire and Buckinghamshire Light Infantry
 1st Battalion, Royal Ulster Rifles
53rd Light Regiment, Royal Artillery
3rd and 4th Airlanding Anti-Tank Batteries, Royal Artillery
6th Airborne Armoured Reconnaissance Regiment, Royal Armoured Corps
249th Airborne Field Company Royal Engineers
3rd, 591st Parachute Squadrons Royal Engineers
3rd, 9th Airborne Squadrons Royal Engineers
286th Airborne Field Park Company Royal Engineers
6th Airborne Divisional Signals Company Royal Signals
22nd Independent Parachute Company Army Air Corps

  51st (Highland) Infantry Division
 Maj-Gen. G T.G. Rennie
 152nd Infantry Brigade
 2nd Battalion, Seaforth Highlanders
 5th Battalion, Seaforth Highlanders
 5th Battalion, Queen's Own Cameron Highlanders
 153rd Infantry Brigade
 5th Battalion, Black Watch
 1st Battalion, Gordon Highlanders
 5/7th Battalion, Gordon Highlanders
 154th Infantry Brigade
 1st Battalion, Black Watch
 7th Battalion, Black Watch
 7th Battalion, Argyll and Sutherland Highlanders
 126th, 127th, and 128th Field Regiments, Royal Artillery
 2nd Derbyshire Yeomanry
 61st Antitank Regiment, Royal Artillery
 40th Light AA Regiment, Royal Artillery
 274th, 275th, and 276th Field Companies Royal Engineers
 239th Field Park Company Royal Engineers
 16th Bridging Platoon Royal Engineers
 51st Divisional Signals Company Royal Signals
 1/7th Machine Gun Battalion Middlesex Regiment

  53rd (Welsh) Infantry Division
 Maj-Gen. Robert Knox Ross
 71st Infantry Brigade
 1st Battalion, Oxfordshire and Buckinghamshire Light Infantry
 1st Battalion, Highland Light Infantry
 4th Battalion, Royal Welch Fusiliers
 158th Infantry Brigade
 7th Battalion, Royal Welch Fusiliers
 1/5th Battalion, Welch Regiment
 1st Battalion, East Lancashire Regiment
 160th Infantry Brigade
 2nd Battalion, Monmouthshire Regiment
 1/5th Battalion, Welch Regiment
 6th Battalion, Royal Welch Fusiliers
 81st, 83rd, and 133rd Field Regiments, Royal Artillery
 53rd Recce Regiment, Royal Armoured Corps
 71st Antitank Regiment, Royal Artillery
 25th Light AA Regiment, Royal Artillery
 244th, 282nd, and 555th Field Companies Royal Engineers
 285th Field Park Company Royal Engineers
 22nd Bridging Platoon Royal Engineers
 53rd Divisional Signals Company Royal Signals
 1st Machine Gun Battalion Manchester Regiment

 29th Armoured Brigade
 Brig. C.B.C Harvey
 23rd Hussars
 3rd Royal Tank Regiment
 2nd Fife and Forfar Yeomanry
 8th Battalion, Rifle Brigade

 33rd Armoured Brigade
 Brig. H.B. Scott
 144th Regiment Royal Armoured Corps
 1st Northamptonshire Yeomanry
 1st East Riding Yeomanry

 34th Army Tank Brigade
 Brig. G W.S. Clarke
 9th Royal Tank Regiment
 107th Regiment Royal Armoured Corps
 147th Regiment Royal Armoured Corps

Corps Reserve

  Guards Armoured Division
 Maj.-Gen. Allan Henry Shafto Adair
 5th Guards Armoured Brigade
 2nd Battalion, Grenadier Guards
 1st Battalion, Coldstream Guards
 2nd Battalion, Irish Guards
 1st Battalion, Grenadier Guards (Mechanized)
 32nd Guards Brigade
 5th Battalion, Coldstream Guards
 3rd Battalion, Irish Guards
 1st Battalion, Welsh Guards
 2nd Battalion, Welsh Guards (Recce)
 14th Field Company, Royal Engineers
 615th Field Company, Royal Engineers
 53rd Field Regiment, Royal Artillery
 153rd Field Regiment, Royal Artillery
 21st Anti-Tank Regiment, Royal Artillery
 94th Light Anti-Aircraft Regiment, Royal Artillery

  43rd (Wessex) Infantry Division
 Maj-Gen. Ivor Thomas
 129th Infantry Brigade
 4th Battalion, Somerset Light Infantry
 4th Battalion, Wiltshire Regiment
 5th Battalion, Wiltshire Regiment
 130th Infantry Brigade
 7th Battalion, Hampshire Regiment
 4th Battalion, Dorsetshire Regiment
 5th Battalion, Dorsetshire Regiment
 214th Infantry Brigade
 7th Battalion, Somerset Light Infantry
 1st Battalion, Worcestershire Regiment
 5th Battalion, Duke of Cornwall's Light Infantry
 8th Battalion, Middlesex Regiment (Vickers Machine Gunners)
 43rd Reconnaissance Regiment, Royal Armoured Corps
 94th Field Regiment, Royal Artillery
 112th Field Regiment, Royal Artillery
 179th Field Regiment, Royal Artillery
 59th Anti-Tank Regiment, Royal Artillery
 13th Bridging Platoon, Royal Engineers
 204th Field Company, Royal Engineers
 207th Field Park Company, Royal Engineers (from Bath, Somerset).
 260th Field Company, Royal Engineers (from Chippenham, Wiltshire).
 553rd Field Company, Royal Engineers
 54th Company, RASC
 504th Company, RASC
 505th Company, RASC
 506th Divisional Company, RASC
 110th Light Anti Aircraft Regiment, Royal Artillery

  50th (Northumbrian) Infantry Division
 Maj-Gen. Douglas Alexander Graham
 69th Infantry Brigade
 5th Battalion, East Yorkshire Regiment
 6th Battalion, Green Howards
 7th Battalion, Green Howards
 151st Infantry Brigade
 6th Battalion, Durham Light Infantry
 8th Battalion, Durham Light Infantry
 9th Battalion, Durham Light Infantry
 231st Infantry Brigade
 1st Battalion, Hampshire Regiment
 1st Battalion, Dorsetshire Regiment
 1st/7th Battalion, Queen's (Royal West Surrey Regiment)
 2nd Battalion, Cheshire Regiment
 74th Field Regiment, Royal Artillery
 90th Field Regiment, Royal Artillery
 124th Field Regiment, Royal Artillery
 102nd Anti-Tank Regiment (Northumberland Hussars), Royal Artillery
 25th Light Anti-Aircraft Regiment, Royal Artillery
 233rd Field Company, Royal Engineers
 501st Field Company, Royal Engineers
 505th Field Company, Royal Engineers
 235th Field Park Company, Royal Engineers

Allied 12th Army Group 

Lieutenant General Omar N. Bradley

US First Army

Lieutenant General Courtney H. Hodges
 5th Belgian Fusilier Battalion
 143rd and 413th AA Gun Battalions
 526th Armored Infantry Battalion
 99th Infantry Battalion (Norwegian-Americans)

V Corps

Major General Leonard T. Gerow
♦ Units that absorbed the initial German assault 16 Dec

 Corps-level units
 56th Signal Battalion
 102nd Cavalry Group, Mechanized♦
 38th and 102nd Cavalry Recon Squadrons (attached)
 613th TD Battalion
 186th, 196th, 200th, and 955th FA Battalions
 254th Engineer Combat Battalion
 187th FA Group (751st and 997th FA Battalions)
 190th FA Group (62nd, 190th, 272nd, and 268th FA Battalions)
 406th FA Group (76th, 941st, 953rd, and 987th FA Battalions)
 1111th Engineer Combat Group (51st, 202nd, 291st, and 296th Engineer Combat Battalions)
 1121st Engineer Combat Group (146th, 254th Engineer Combat Battalions)
 1195th Engineer Combat Group
 134th, 387th, 445th, 460th, 461st, 531st, 602nd, 639th, and 863rd AAA AW Battalions

  1st Infantry ("Big Red One") Division
 Brigadier General Clift Andrus
 16th, 18th and 26th Infantry Regiments
 5th, 7th, 32nd, and 33rd FA Battalions
 1st Engineer Combat Battalion
 745th Tank Battalion
 634th and 703rd TD Battalions
 103rd AAA AW Battalion

  2nd Infantry ("Indianhead") Division
 Major General Walter M. Robertson
 9th♦, 23rd♦, and 38th♦ Infantry Regiments
 12th, 15th, 37th, and 38th FA Battalions
 2nd Engineer Combat Battalion
 741st Tank Battalion
 612th and 644th TD Battalions
 462nd AAA AW Battalion

  9th Infantry ("Old Reliables") Division 
 Major General Louis A. Craig
 39th, 47th, and 60th Infantry Regiments
 26th, 34th, 60th, and 84th FA Battalions
 15th Engineer Combat Battalion
 38th Cavalry Recon Squadron
 746th Tank Battalion
 376th and 413th AAA AW Battalions

  78th Infantry ("Lightning") Division 
 Major General Edwin P. Parker Jr.
 309th, 310th, and 311th Infantry Regiments
 307th, 308th, 309th, and 903rd FA Battalions
 303rd Engineer Combat Battalion
 709th Tank Battalion
 628th and 893rd TD Battalions
 552nd AAA AW Battalion
  CCR, 5th Armored Division (attached)
  2nd Ranger Battalion (attached)

  99th Infantry ("Checkerboard") Division  
 Major General Walter E. Lauer
 393rd♦, 394th♦, and 395th♦ Infantry Regiments
 370th, 371st, 372nd, and 924th FA Battalions
 324th Engineer Combat Battalion
 801st TD Battalion
 535th AAA AW Battalion

VII Corps

Major General J. Lawton Collins
♦ Units that absorbed the initial German assault 16 Dec

 Corps-level units
 4th Cavalry Group, Mechanized
 29th Infantry Regiment
 Two French Light Infantry Battalions
 509th Parachute Infantry Battalion
 298th Engineer Combat Battalion
 740th Tank Battalion
 18th FA Group (188th, 666th, and 981st FA Battalions)
 142nd FA Group (195th and 266th FA Battalions)
 188th FA Group (172nd, 951st, and 980th FA Battalions)
 342nd, 366th, 392nd♦, 1308th, and 1313th Engineer General Service Regiments
 18th, 83rd, 87th, 183rd, 193rd, 957th, and 991st FA Battalions

  2nd Armored ("Hell on Wheels") Division 
 Major General Ernest N. Harmon
 41st Armored Infantry Regiment
 66th and 67th Armored Regiments
 14th, 78th, and 92nd Armored FA Battalions
 17th Armored Engineer Battalion
 82nd Armored Reconnaissance Battalion
 702nd TD Battalion
 195th AAA AW Battalion
 elements of 738th Tank Battalion (special - mine clearing) attached

  3rd Armored ("Spearhead") Division 
 Major General Maurice Rose
 36th Armored Infantry Regiment
 32nd and 33rd Armored Regiments
 54th, 67th, and 391st Armored FA Battalions
 23rd Armored Engineer Battalion
 83rd Recon Squadron
 643rd and 703rd TD Battalions
 486th AAA AW Battalion

  83rd Infantry ("Ohio") Division 
 Major General Robert C. Macon
 329th, 330th, and 331st Infantry Regiments
 322nd, 323rd, 324th, and 908th FA Battalions
 308th Engineer Combat Battalion
 453rd AAA AW Battalion
 774th Tank Battalion
 772nd TD Battalion

  84th Infantry ("Railsplitters") Division 
 Brigadier General Alexander R. Bolling
 333rd, 334th, and 335th Infantry Regiments
 325th, 326th, 327th, and 909th FA Battalions
 309th Engineer Combat Battalion
 701st Tank Battalion, replaced by 771st Tank Battalion on 20 December
 638th TD Battalion
 557th AAA AW Battalion

XVIII Airborne Corps

Major General Matthew B. Ridgway
♦ Units that absorbed the initial German assault 16 Dec

 Corps-level units
 14th Cavalry Group, Mechanized♦
 254th, 275th, 400th, and 460th FA Battalions
 79th FA Group (153rd, 551st, and 552nd FA Battalions)
 179th FA Group (259th and 965th FA Battalions)
 211th FA Group (240th and 264th FA Battalions)
 401st FA Group (187th and 809th FA Battalions)

  7th Armored ("Lucky Seventh") Division 
 Brigadier General Robert W. Hasbrouck
 Combat Commands A, B, and R
 23rd, 38th, and 48th Armored Infantry Battalions
 17th, 31st, and 40th Tank Battalions
 434th, 440th, and 489th Armored FA Battalions
 33rd Armored Engineer Battalion
 87th Recon Squadron
 814th TD Battalion
 203rd AAA AW Battalion
 820th TD Battalion (attached 25–30 December)

  30th Infantry ("Old Hickory") Division 
 Major General Leland S. Hobbs
 117th, 119th, and 120th Infantry Regiments
 113th, 118th, 197th, and 230th FA Battalions
 105th Engineer Combat Battalion
 743rd Tank Battalion
 823rd TD Battalion
 517th Parachute Infantry Regiment (attached)
 110th, 431st and 448th AAA AW Battalions

  75th Infantry Division
 Major General Fay B. Prickett
 289th, 290th, and 291st Infantry Regiments
 730th, 897th, 898th, and 899th FA Battalions
 275th Engineer Combat Battalion
 750th Tank Battalion
 629th and 772nd TD Battalions
 440th AAA AW Battalion

  82nd Airborne ("All American") Division 
 Major General James M. Gavin
 504th, 505th, 507th, and 508th Parachute Infantry Regiments
 325th Glider Infantry Regiment
 319th and 320th Glider FA Battalions
 376th and 456th Parachute FA Battalions
 307th Airborne Engineer Battalion
 80th AAA AW Battalion
 551st Parachute Infantry Battalion
 740th Tank Battalion (attached 30 December – 11 January)
 628th TD Battalion (attached 2–11 January)
 643rd TD Battalion (attached 4–5 January)

  106th Infantry ("Golden Lions") Division 
 Major General Alan W. Jones
 422nd♦, 423rd♦, and 424th♦ Infantry Regiments
 589th, 590th, 591st, and 592nd FA Battalions
 81st Engineer Combat Battalion
 820th TD Battalion
 634th AAA AW Battalion (8–18 December)
 440th AAA AW Battalion (8 December – 4 January)
 563rd AAA AW Battalion (9–18 December)

  101st Airborne ("Screaming Eagles") Division 
 Brigadier General Anthony C. McAuliffe (acting)
 501st, 502nd, and 506th Parachute Infantry Regiments
 327th Glider Infantry Regiment
 1st Battalion, 401st Glider Infantry
 321st and 907th Glider FA Battalions
 377th and 463rd Parachute FA Battalion
 326th Parachute Engineer Battalion
 705th TD Battalion
 81st Airborne AAA AW Battalion

US Third Army

Lieutenant General George S. Patton
 109th, 115th, 217th, and 777th AA Gun Battalions
 456th, 465th, 550th, and 565th AAA AW Battalions
 280th ECB - Engineer Combat Battalion - Non Divisional Unit (later assigned to the 9th Army)

III Corps

Major General John Millikin

 Corps-level units
 6th Cavalry Group, Mechanized
 179th, 274th, 776th, and 777th FA Battalions
 193rd FA Group (177th, 253rd, 696th, 776th, and 949th FA Battalions)
 203rd FA Group (278th, 742nd, 762nd FA Battalions)
 183rd and 243rd Engineer Combat Battalions
 1137th Engineer Combat Group (145th, 188th, and 249th Engineer Combat Battalions)
 467th and 468th AAA AW Battalions

  4th Armored Division
 Major General Hugh J. Gaffey
 Combat Commands A, B, and R
 8th, 35th, and 37th Tank Battalions
 10th, 51st, and 53rd Armored Infantry Battalions
 22nd, 66th, and 94th Armored FA Battalions
 24th Armored Engineer Battalion
 25th Cavalry Recon Squadron
 489th AAA AW Battalion
 704th TD Battalion

  6th Armored ("Super Sixth") Division 
 Major General Robert W. Grow
 Combat Commands A, B, and R
 15th, 68th and 69th Tank Battalions
 9th, 44th, and 50th Armored Infantry Battalions
 128th, 212th, and 231st Armored FA Battalions
 25th Armored Engineer Battalion
 86th Cavalry Recon Squadron
 691st TD Battalion
 777th AAA AW Battalion

  26th Infantry ("Yankee") Division 
 Major General Willard S. Paul
 101st, 104th, and 328th Infantry Regiments
 101st, 102nd, 180th, and 263rd FA Battalions
 101st Engineer Combat Battalion
 735th Tank Battalion
 818th TD Battalion
 390th AAA AW Battalion

  35th Infantry ("Santa Fe") Division 
 Major General Paul W. Baade
 134th, 137th, and 320th Infantry Regiments
 127th, 161st, 216th, and 219th FA Battalions
 60th Engineer Combat Battalion
 654th TD Battalion
 448th AAA AW Battalion

  90th Infantry ("Tough 'Ombres") Division 
 Major General James A. Van Fleet
 357th, 358th, and 359th Infantry Regiments
 343rd, 344th, 345th, and 915th FA Battalions
 315th Engineer Combat Battalion
 773rd TD Battalion
 774th TD Battalion (attached 21 December – 6 January)
 537th AAA AW Battalion

VIII Corps

Major General Troy H. Middleton
♦ Units that absorbed the initial German assault 16 Dec

 Corps-level units
 687th FA Battalion
 174th FA Group (965th, 969th, and 700th FA Battalions)
 333rd FA Group (333rd and 771st FA Battalions)
 402nd FA Group (559th, 561st, and 740th FA Battalions)
 422nd FA Group (81st and 174th FA Battalions)
 178th and 249th Engineer Combat Battalions
 1102nd Engineer Group (341st Engineer General Service Regiment)
 1107th Engineer Combat Group (159th, 168th, and 202nd Engineer Combat Battalions)
 1128th Engineer Combat Group (35th, 44th, and 202nd Engineer Combat Battalions)
 French Light Infantry (six Light Infantry Battalions from Metz region)
 467th, 635th, 778th AAA AW Battalions

  9th Armored ("Phantom") Division 
 Major General John W. Leonard
 Combat Commands A♦, B♦, and R♦
 27th, 52nd, and 60th Armored Infantry Battalions
 2nd, 14th, and 19th Tank Battalions
 3rd, 16th, and 73rd Armored FA Battalions
 9th Armored Engineer Battalion
 89th Cavalry Squadron
 811th TD Battalion
 482nd AAA AW Battalion

  11th Armored ("Thunderbolt") Division 
 Brigadier General Charles S. Kilburn
 Combat Commands A, B, and R
 21st, 55th, and 63rd Armored Infantry Battalions
 22nd, 41st, and 42nd Tank Battalions
 490th, 491st, and 492nd Armored FA Battalions
 56th Armored Engineer Battalion
 602nd TD Battalion
 41st Cavalry Squadron
 575th AAA AW Battalion

  17th Airborne ("Golden Talons") Division 
 Major General William M. Miley
507th and 513th Parachute Infantry Regiments
 193rd and 194th Glider Infantry Regiments
 680th and 681st Glider FA Battalions
 466th Parachute FA Battalion
 139th Airborne Engineer Battalion
 155th Airborne AAA AW Battalion

  28th Infantry ("Keystone") Division 
 Major General Norman D. Cota
 109th♦, 110th♦, and 112th♦ Infantry Regiments
 107th, 108th, 109th, and 229th FA Battalions
 103rd Engineer Combat Battalion
 707th Tank Battalion
 602nd TD Battalion
 630th TD Battalion
 447th AAA AW Battalion

  87th Infantry ("Golden Acorn") Division 
 Brigadier General Frank L. Culin Jr.
 345th, 346th, and 347th Infantry Regiments
 334th, 335th, 336th, 912th FA Battalions
 312th Engineer Combat Battalion
 761st Tank Battalion
 549th AAA AW Battalion
 610th TD battalion (14–22 December)
 691st TD battalion (22–24 December and 8–26 January)
 704th TD battalion (17–19 December)

XII Corps

Major General Manton S. Eddy
♦ Units that absorbed the initial German assault 16 Dec

 Corps-level units
 2nd Cavalry Group, Mechanized
 161st, 244th, 277th, 334th, 336th, and 736th FA Battalions
 177th FA group 215th, 255th, and 775th FA Battalions
 182nd FA group 802nd, 945th, and 974th FA Battalions
 183rd FA group 695th and 776th FA Battalions
 404th FA group 273rd, 512th, and 752nd FA Battalions
 1303rd Engineer Service Regiment
 452nd AAA Automatic Weapons Battalion [colored]
 457th AAA Automatic Weapons Battalion

  4th Infantry ("Ivy") Division 
 Major General Raymond O. Barton
 8th♦, 12th♦, and 22nd Infantry Regiments
 20th, 29th, 42nd, and 44th FA Battalions
 4th Engineer Combat Battalion
 70th Tank Battalion
 802nd and 803rd TD Battalions
 377th AAA AW Battalions

  5th Infantry ("Red Diamond") Division 
 Major General Stafford L. Irwin
 2nd, 10th, and 11th Infantry Regiments
 19th, 21st, 46th, and 50th FA Battalions
 7th Engineer Combat Battalion
 737th Tank Battalion
 654th TD Battalion (22–25 December)
 803rd TD Battalion (from 25 December)
 807th TD Battalion (17–21 December)
 818th TD Battalion (13 July – 20 December)
 449th AAA AW Battalion

  10th Armored ("Tiger") Division 
 Major General William H. H. Morris Jr.
 Combat Commands A, B, and R
 20th, 54th, and 61st Armored Infantry Battalions
 3rd, 11th, and 21st Tank Battalions
 419th, 420th, and 423rd Armored FA Battalions
 609th TD Battalion
 55th Armored Engineer Battalion
 90th Cavalry Recon Squadron
 796th AAA AW Battalion

  80th Infantry ("Blue Ridge") Division 
 Major General Horace L. McBride
 317th, 318th, and 319th Infantry Regiments
 313th, 314th, 315th, and 905th FA Battalions
 305th Engineer Combat Battalion
 702nd Tank Battalion
 610th TD Battalion (23 November – 6 December and 21 December – 28 January)
 808th TD Battalion (25 September – 21 December)
 633rd AAA AW Battalion

Allied Air Forces

US Strategic Air Forces in Europe 
General Carl Spaatz

  US Eighth Air Force (Strategic)
 Lieutenant General James H. Doolittle
  US Ninth Air Force (Tactical)
 Lieutenant General Hoyt S. Vandenberg
 IX Bombardment Division (Maj. Gen. Samuel E. Anderson)
 IX Troop Carrier Command (Maj. Gen. Paul L. Williams)
 IX Tactical Air Command (Maj. Gen. Elwood R. Quesada)
 Supporting First Army
 XIX Tactical Air Command (Maj. Gen. Otto P. Weyland)
 Supporting Third Army
 XXIX Tactical Air Command (Brig. Gen. Richard E. Nugent)
 Supporting Ninth Army

Royal Air Force
 Bomber Command
 Air Chief Marshal Sir Arthur "Bomber" Harris
 Fighter Command
 Air Marshal Sir Roderic M. Hill
 Second Tactical Air Force
 Air Marshal Sir Arthur Coningham
 No. 2 Group RAF
 No. 83 Group RAF
 No. 84 Group RAF

Notes

References

 

World War II orders of battle